Shaun Dimech (born 8 August 2001) is a Maltese footballer who plays as a midfielder for Valletta F.C. and the Malta national team.

Career
Dimech made his international debut for Malta on 7 October 2020 in a friendly match against Gibraltar.

Career statistics

International

International goals
Scores and results list Malta's goal tally first.

References

External links
 
 

2001 births
Living people
Maltese footballers
Malta youth international footballers
Malta under-21 international footballers
Malta international footballers
Association football midfielders
Valletta F.C. players
Maltese Premier League players